Center Valley is an unincorporated community in Center Township, Pope County, Arkansas, United States. 

The Center Valley Well House, which was built in 1940 by the Works Progress Administration, is on the National Register of Historic Places.

References

Unincorporated communities in Pope County, Arkansas
Unincorporated communities in Arkansas